Alcohol in Malaysia refers to the consumption, industry and laws of alcohol in the Southeast Asian country of Malaysia. Although Malaysia is a Muslim majority country, the country permits the selling of alcohol to non-Muslims. There are no nationwide alcohol bans being enforced in the country, with the exception of Kelantan and Terengganu which is only for Muslims. The Islamic party  respects the rights of non-Muslims with non-Muslim establishments like Chinese restaurants and grocery shops being excluded from such bans. The federal territory of Kuala Lumpur has the highest alcohol consumption in the country, followed by the states of Sarawak in second place and Sabah in third place.

Based on a report released by International Organisation of Good Templars (IOGT) in 2016, Malaysia has the third highest tax on alcohol worldwide at 15%, behind Norway and Singapore which are predicted to keep increasing. The country has the 10th largest population of alcohol users worldwide, with an annual spending of RM2 billion on alcoholic drinks. Prior to the Trans-Pacific Partnership, Malaysia together with Vietnam plans to drop import tariffs on beer, whiskey and other alcoholic drinks.

History and tradition 

The history of local alcoholic drinks in the country is mostly concentrated in the island of Borneo. Indigenous islanders traditionally drank home-made rice wines called tuak and tapai in their communal gatherings and harvest festivals of Gawai Dayak and Kaamatan. Alcohol consumption in the Malay Peninsula meanwhile was less common, as the Malay sultanates there adhered to Islamic principles regarding to alcohol. But following the arrival of alcoholic drinks from the Western world to Malay Archipelago in the 17th century when European colonial merchants began to come in contact with the people in the archipelago, some local Malay population start to taste wine brought by the Portuguese and Dutch and this was continued until the arrival of British until the 19th and 20th centuries. The arrival of Indian labours in British plantations during the colonial times marks the introduction of "toddy" production by the Indian community, as well with the arrival of Chinese labourers on British mines who produce and introduce their own alcoholic drink such as "samsu" to the local community. The British also brought their own drinking traditions, introducing beer and stout. In the 1930, the first brewery was established in neighbouring British Singapore.

Industry and products

Beer 

Since the British colonial times, Tiger Beer was the first commercial beer brewed in 1932 by Malayan Breweries Limited, a Singapore-based brewery which was formed from a merger between Heineken and Fraser and Neave (F&N). The beginning of alcohol productions in Malaysia start in 1968, when two leading breweries of Guinness and Malayan Breweries merged to form a new company known as Guinness Anchor Berhad. In 1970, Carlsberg established its first brewery outside Kuala Lumpur. Both are since the only legal commercial breweries in Malaysia, which account for 95% of the total beer and stout volume in the country market. In 2007, another two breweries known as Napex and Jaz brewed beer for pubs in the country, but both have since ceased from operation. Beside local productions, many alcoholic drinks in the country are also imported from neighbouring countries such as Singapore, Thailand, Indonesia, Philippines and Vietnam.

Tuak 

Tuak (Dayak), also known as lihing (Kadazan-Dusun) or tapai (Malay), is a rice wine made from fermented rice and yeast, with an alcohol content between 5% and 20%.  It is common in Borneo and particularly important for the Dayak people.

Arak putik 
Arak putih, Malay for "white liquor", is a generic term for locally produced distilled liquor (arrack).  While sometimes mistranslated as white wine, the drink is typically much stronger than wine (up to 60%) and is not made from grapes.

Regulation 

The legal drinking age(purchasing) for Malaysia is 21 years old and above. The legal limit for alcohol while driving in Malaysia is 80 milligrams per decilitre or 100 millilitres. Any vendors, restaurants and retailers need a licence to serve or sell tap/draft beers, liquor and spirits in the country. Bottled and canned beers are exempted from such licence requirements, which is why it is common to find many vendors and coffee houses serving alcohol in their premises without a licence. Malaysia also imposes nationwide regulations for vendors to place their alcoholic drinks into separate refrigerators or storage places, although this was opposed by certain vendors in the state of Penang. The high tax on alcohol has increased the price of alcoholic drinks in Malaysia, harming some drinkers who turn to unsafe alcohol smuggled in from neighbouring countries. In 2018, around 45 people died in the country's worst methanol poisoning involving foreign workers and several Malaysians due to the consumption of cheap fake liquors acquired from the country's black markets.

Following Demerit Points System for Traffic Offences (KEJARA), a Police office or JPJ officer can take breath, blood or urine samples of drunk driver. If alcohol content is found in the samples, a fine of RM 2000 or 6 months imprisonment may be imposed for the first offence.

Alcohol is generally prohibited for Muslim consumers in the country as Malaysia's sharia law forbids Muslims from drinking alcohol. Alcohol is mostly banned for Muslims in the states of Kelantan and Terengganu.

See also 

 Alcohol in Australia
 Alcohol in Indonesia
 Alcohol in New Zealand

References 

 
Malaysia